Caleruega is a small town and municipality in the autonomous community of Castile-Leon, Spain. It is part of the Province of Burgos. The town is a few miles south of the Monastery of Santo Domingo de Silos.

People from Caleruega
Saint Dominic (1170–1221) - Catholic church priest and founder of the Dominican Order

References

External links
Caleruega News Web
Ayuntamiento de Caleruega
 pentecostes

Municipalities in the Province of Burgos